"So What'cha Want" is the second single from the album Check Your Head, the third studio album by American rap rock group the Beastie Boys. Released on June 2, 1992, the song samples "Just Rhymin' With Biz", by Big Daddy Kane featuring Biz Markie, and "I've Been Watching You" by Southside Movement. The song also appears in the video game Rock Band 2.

Music video
The music video, directed by Nathanial Hörnblowér, simply has the Beastie Boys recite the song in a woodland, addressing the viewer by looking down at the camera which is at ground level, with clips of DJ Hurricane and Money Mark interspersed throughout. It was one of the first music videos to feature slow motion action while the artists' lips remained in sync with the sound track, an effect that would later become a mainstay of music videos.  The sky has a photo negative effect which was created by visualist Ash Beck, a direct allusion to the werewolf point-of-view in 1981 horror film Wolfen. Similarly, the infrared style incorporated during the band cutaways are a homage to the hunter vision in Predator.  The video was also featured on the 1993 "No Laughing" episode of Beavis and Butt-Head.

Track listing
"So What'cha Want" (Single version) – 3:37
"The Skills to Pay the Bills" (Original version) – 3:14
"So What'cha Want" (Soul Assassin Remix version) – 4:06
"Groove Holmes" (LP version) – 2:34
"So What'cha Want" (Butt Naked version) – 3:25
"Groove Holmes" (Live vs. the Biz) – 6:10
"So What'cha Want" (All the Way Live Freestyle version) – 3:37

Charts

References

1992 singles
1992 songs
Beastie Boys songs
Capitol Records singles
Songs written by Ad-Rock
Songs written by Mike D
Songs written by Adam Yauch
Songs written by Mario Caldato Jr.
Song recordings produced by Mario Caldato Jr.